The Pakistan national cricket team toured New Zealand in January and February 1979 and played a three-match Test series against the New Zealand national cricket team. Pakistan won the series 1–0. New Zealand were captained by Mark Burgess and Pakistan by Mushtaq Mohammad.

Test series summary

First Test

Second Test

Third Test

References

External links

1979 in Pakistani cricket
1979 in New Zealand cricket
International cricket competitions from 1975–76 to 1980
New Zealand cricket seasons from 1970–71 to 1999–2000
1979